Priyanca Radhakrishnan  (born 1979) is a New Zealand politician who has been elected to the New Zealand parliament since the 2017 general election as a representative of the New Zealand Labour Party and is currently Minister for the Community and Voluntary Sector (since 2020).

Early life and career
Radhakrishnan was born in Chennai, India to Malayali Nair parents. Her great grandfather Dr C. R. Krishna Pillai, was associated with Left wing politics in India, and played an instrumental role in the formation the Kerala state. She grew up in Singapore before moving to New Zealand. In Singapore she got her first job at around 16 as an educational entertainer, performing educational skits for kindergarten kids. She attended Victoria University of Wellington and graduated with a master's degree in development studies.

After graduating, Radhakrishnan worked as a social worker among the Indian community in Auckland. She joined the New Zealand Labour Party in 2006 and has worked on the internal party policy development process and has been active in both local and regional party organisation.

Political career

At the  election, Radhakrishnan was ranked number 23 on the Labour Party list, the highest newcomer, but narrowly missed out on election due to a drop in Labour's party vote that year. She was also ranked number 12 on Labour's list, making her the highest-ranked Labour member not already an MP and a significant increase from her ranking three years earlier.

Radhakrishnan did not win the electorate, but entered parliament via the Party list.

Radhakrishnan was mugged in broad daylight in an Auckland street after returning from a visit to Bangladesh.

Following a cabinet reshuffle on 27 June 2019, Radhakrishnan was appointed as the Parliamentary Private Secretary for Ethnic Affairs.

During the 2020 New Zealand general election held on 17 October, Radhakrishnan on preliminary results came second to National MP Denise Lee by a margin of 580 votes in the Maungakiekie electorate, but was returned to Parliament on the Labour Party list. The final election results saw Radhakrishnan defeat Lee by 635 votes and become MP for Maungakiekie.

On 2 November 2020, Radhakrishnan was appointed as Minister for the Community and Voluntary Sector, Minister for Diversity, Inclusion and Ethnic Communities, Minister for Youth and Associate Minister for Social Development and Employment, making her New Zealand's first Minister of Indian origin.  In a June 2022 reshuffle, Radhakrishnan was promoted to the cabinet as well as appointed as associate Minister for Workplace Relations and Safety by Prime Minister Jacinda Ardern.

Honours and awards
In January 2021, Radhakrishnan was conferred a Pravasi Bharatiya Samman award for public service, by the Indian president in a virtual ceremony.

References

|-

|-

|-

Living people
New Zealand Labour Party MPs
Members of the New Zealand House of Representatives
21st-century New Zealand women politicians
New Zealand list MPs
Women members of the New Zealand House of Representatives
Unsuccessful candidates in the 2014 New Zealand general election
New Zealand people of Indian descent
Victoria University of Wellington alumni
Candidates in the 2017 New Zealand general election
1979 births
Candidates in the 2020 New Zealand general election
Recipients of Pravasi Bharatiya Samman
Members of the Cabinet of New Zealand
Women government ministers of New Zealand